The Welsh Liberal Democrats leadership election took place during the autumn of 2017 and was won by Jane Dodds, who defeated Ceredigion Councillor Elizabeth Evans in a closely fought contest.

Following the 2017 general election the party's leader, and only MP, Mark Williams lost his Ceredigion seat by 104 votes. Because of this he stood down as leader later that day.

His predecessor as leader, Kirsty Williams, took over as interim leader, but announced she wouldn't be a candidate in the forthcoming leadership election.

Jane Dodds was declared the winner with 56.5% of the vote on 3 November 2017.

Candidates 

Close of ballots was 5PM on 30 October 2017.

Result

References

2017 in Wales
Welsh Liberal Democrats
Leaders of political parties in Wales
Political party leadership elections in Wales
Welsh Liberal Democrats leadership election